Tunisia, participated at the 2010 African Youth Games held in Rabat, Morocco. She won 58 medals.

Medal summary

Medal table

See also
 Tunisia at the All-Africa Games

References

African Youth Games
Sport in Tunisia